Q'axilu (Aymara, hispanicized spelling Cajelo, also Kajelo, K'ajelo, Q'ajelo) is a folk dance of the Aymara people in the Puno Region of Peru. It is a typical dance of the Puno, Chucuito and El Collao provinces. Q'axilu is also the name of a genre of love song of the Puno Region.

Gallery

References 

Peruvian dances
Peruvian music
Native American dances
Puno Region